The Oshawa municipal election, 2006 was held in Oshawa, Ontario, Canada, concurrently with other municipal elections throughout the province, to elect the members of Oshawa City Council.

Mayoral race

City council

City and regional council

2006 Ontario municipal elections
Politics of Oshawa